Laupen District was one of the 26 administrative districts in the canton of Bern, Switzerland. Its capital was the municipality of Laupen. The district had an area of 88 km² and consisted of 11 municipalities:

The municipalities of Clavaleyres and Münchenwiler are enclaved within the canton of Fribourg.

External links
 Official website of Laupen

References

Former districts of the canton of Bern